Tobacco Factory Theatres is located on the first floor of the Tobacco Factory building on the corner of North Street and Raleigh Road, Southville in Bristol, England. The theatre itself is a studio-style space, with a low ceiling and fixed grid with structural pillars which intrude into the acting area. There is a bar/foyer area, a dance studio and Box Office. The theatre can seat up to 350 people, although usually it has a capacity of about 250. The programme includes classic and contemporary theatre, comedy, dance, puppetry, film, opera, music and family shows. In 2012 over 100,000 people came through the theatre doors  and the theatre is regularly attracting national critical acclaim.

History
Tobacco was the main industry in South Bristol from the beginning of the twentieth century and at its peak around 40% of the local workforce worked in the Imperial Tobacco Factory. The relocation of Imperial Tobacco in the 1980s was devastating to the local area, causing massive unemployment and deprivation. The Tobacco Factory building itself fell into disrepair but was renewed from the late 1990s when George Ferguson acquired the building, inviting Show of Strength Theatre Company to use part of the first floor as a theatre space. The building became a mixed-use cultural space with a café-bar and a 250-seat studio theatre, under the name of Tobacco Factory Theatre.

In 2005 the Tobacco Factory Theatres became a charitable trust and in 2007 it became a Key Arts Provider of Bristol City Council. It has expanded since 2008. It now has two auditoria (the Factory Theatre and the Brewery Theatre) and two rehearsal spaces. It has made capital improvements, including the installation of a renewable energy system. The theatre regularly attracts national critical acclaim. It has strong relationships with many individual artists, with venues and with theatre companies. It is particularly well known for productions by Shakespeare at the Tobacco Factory, inhouse family-friendly productions and a comedy line-up, as well as classic and contemporary theatre, dance, puppetry, film, opera and music.

The theatre was redesigned in 2013 and has become one of the UK's few Theatre-in-the-Round auditoria, increasing the maximum seating capacity to 350, with improved comfort and sightlines. The theatre can still be used for end stage and thrust stage performance.

The current Artistic Director is Mike Tweddle, appointed in 2016.

Brewery Theatre
The Brewery Theatre opened its doors for the first time on 29 August 2009. Previously an old tyre garage, the building is approximately 160 yards (146 m) down the road from the Tobacco Factory and houses the 90-seat Brewery Theatre and Brewery dance studio with sprung floor. The building is also home to Mark’s Bread bakery and cafe, a Bristol Beer Factory Brewery and Visitors' centre.  The Brewery Theatre is programmed with theatre from small scale touring companies to Tobacco Factory Theatre productions. The shows programmed are a range from children’s shows and magic, to clowning, comedy, storytelling and classical theatre.

Inhouse Productions

2013/2014

The Last Voyage of Sinbad the Sailor (Co-production with Travelling Light)

2012/2013

Hansel and Gretel (Co-production with NIE)
The Lost Present
The Room in the Elephant (Co-production with Oran Mor)
Faith Fall (Co-production with Oran Mor)
Made in Heaven (produced by Mark Bruce Company in association with Tobacco Factory Theatre)

2011/2012

Cinderella: A Fairytale (Co-production with Travelling Light)

2010/2011

The Adventures of Pinocchio

2009/2010

Ali Baba and The Forty Thieves (Co-production with Travelling Light)

2008/2009

A Christmas Carol

2007/2008

The Ugly Duckling (Co-production with Travelling Light)
Alice Through The Looking Glass
Topless Mum (Co-production with Imagineer Productions)

Funding
Tobacco Factory Theatres receives approximately seven percent of its funding from public sources such as the Arts Council of England. They raise approximately 85% of their income through box office receipts, bar sales, workshops and space hire. They offer various levels of membership on which they rely to allow the theatre to produce high-quality work.

The theatre is recognised by Bristol City Council as a key arts provider.
 The theatre received funding from the Arts Council of England for the first time in 2007.

See also
List of theatres in Bristol

Notes

Theatre companies in England
Theatres in Bristol
Companies based in Bristol